Hirabad may refer to:

Places

In Iran 
 Khalkhal (formerly Hirabad), city and capital of Khalkhal County, Ardabil Province
 Hirabad, a village in Khodabandeh County, Zanjan Province

In Pakistan 
 Hirabad, a neighbourhood in the city of Hyderabad, Sindh